3277 Aaronson, provisional designation , is a carbonaceous asteroid from the outer region of the asteroid belt, approximately 20 kilometers in diameter. It was discovered by American astronomer Edward Bowell at Lowell's Anderson Mesa Station, near Flagstaff, Arizona, on 8 January 1984, and named in memory of astronomer Marc Aaronson.

Orbit and classification 

The C-type asteroid orbits the Sun in the outer main-belt at a distance of 2.3–4.0 AU once every 5 years and 7 months (2,034 days). Its orbit has an eccentricity of 0.27 and an inclination of 9° with respect to the ecliptic. A first precovery was obtained at Goethe Link Observatory in 1962, extending the asteroid's observation arc by 22 years prior to its official discovery observation at Anderson Mesa.

Physical characteristics

Rotation period 

In November 2010, a rotational lightcurve for this asteroid was obtained from photometric observations made at the U.S. Shadowbox Observatory in Carmel, Indiana. It rendered a rotation period of  hours with a brightness amplitude of 0.14 in magnitude.

Diameter and albedo 

Based on NASA's space-based WISE and its subsequent NEOWISE mission, the asteroid has an albedo of 0.11 and 0.12, and a diameter of 19.9 and 20.0 kilometers, respectively, while the Collaborative Asteroid Lightcurve Link (CALL) assumes a lower albedo of 0.06, which translates into a larger diameter of 26.6 kilometers, as the lower the albedo (reflectivity), the higher the body's diameter, for a given absolute magnitude (brightness).

Naming 

This minor planet was named in memory of American astronomer Marc Aaronson (1950–1987), killed in the dome of the 4-meter Nicholas U. Mayall Telescope of the Kitt Peak National Observatory. His fields of research included the detection the decelerative effect of the Virgo cluster on the Hubble flow, observations of carbon stars in the globular clusters in the Magellanic clouds, and measurement of the large velocity dispersion in dwarf spheroidal galaxies, suggesting that all galaxies do have dark matter halos. The official naming citation was published by the Minor Planet Center on 11 July 1987 .

References

External links 
 Asteroid Lightcurve Database (LCDB), query form (info )
 Dictionary of Minor Planet Names, Google books
 Asteroids and comets rotation curves, CdR – Observatoire de Genève, Raoul Behrend
 Discovery Circumstances: Numbered Minor Planets (1)-(5000) – Minor Planet Center
 
 

003277
Discoveries by Edward L. G. Bowell
Named minor planets
19840108